List of Portuguese Air Force aircraft squadrons and flights, past and present.

Military Aeronautics (Army aviation) flying units

Portuguese Air Force flying units

Squadron designations 
The basic aircraft unit of the Portuguese Air Force (PoAF) is the squadron, which is under the command and part of an operational group. These operational groups are dependent of an air base and commonly use a numerical designation related to the air base's own numerical designation. (Example: Grupo Operacional 11 is dependent of Air Base No. 11.)

Since the Air Force's reorganization of 1978, squadrons have used a three digit designation, with some squadrons starting to adopt this designation system in 1977. The first digit indicates the squadron's primary mission, while the second digit indicates the type of aircraft operated, and with the third digit being a sequential number.

Primary mission designation:
1 – Instruction squadron;
2 – Fighter squadron;
3 – Attack squadron;
4 – Reconnaissance squadron;
5 – Transport squadron;
6 – Maritime patrol squadron;
7 – Search and Rescue squadron;
8 – Special function squadron;

Designation of the type of aircraft operated by the squadron:
0 – Fixed-wing aircraft;
1 – Mixed;
5 – Rotary-wing aircraft;

Until 1977, and prior to this designation system, the PoAF used both numerical designations and names for its flying squadrons. Names were almost exclusively used for small local liaison and transport units and dedicated training squadrons.

The squadrons that used a numerical designation received it based on the air base or base airfield number at which they were based in addition to a sequential number. In example, 51 and 52 Squadron were based at Air Base No. 5 and 122 Squadron was based at Air Base No. 12. Units based at base airfields received a zero as an additional digit in their numeric designation to help differentiate them from units based at air bases. In example, 501 Squadron was based at Base Airfield No. 5.

Flying squadrons

See also 
 Portuguese Air Force
 Portuguese Army
 Portuguese Naval Aviation
 Portuguese Armed Forces
 Portuguese Colonial War
 Portuguese Army Light Aviation Unit
 List of aircraft of the Portuguese Air Force
 List of Portuguese Air Force bases
 Portuguese military aircraft serials
 Portuguese aircraft serials

Notes

References

Bibliography

External links 
 Aircraft squadrons of the Portuguese Air Force, official website 

 
Portugal